People with the surname Chauvel include:

Charles Chauvel (filmmaker) (1897–1959), Australian filmmaker
Charles Chauvel (politician) (born 1969), New Zealand lawyer and politician
Elsa Chauvel (1898–1983), Australian actress and filmmaker; wife of Charles Chauvel
Sir Harry Chauvel (1865–1945), senior officer of the Australian Imperial Force who fought in the First World War
Louis Chauvel (born 1967), French sociologist, full professor at Sciences Po
Patrick Chauvel (born 1949), independent war photographer

See also
Australian landing ship medium Harry Chauvel (AV 1353), United States Navy landing ship medium sold to Australia and operated by the Australian Army
Chauvel Award, a film award

Chauvel Cinema, a cinema in Paddington, Sydney